Polystira jiguaniensis is a species of sea snail, a marine gastropod mollusk in the family Turridae, the turrids.

Description
The length of the shell attains 87.7 mm.

Distribution
This marine species occurs off Cuba.

References

External links
 

jiguaniensis
Gastropods described in 2017